This is a list of drama films of the 1900s.

1901
Fire!

1908
The Black Viper
The Helping Hand
The Song of the Shirt
Choosing a royal bride
The Reconciliation
El pastorcito de Torrente
Don Álvaro o la fuerza del sino
Don Quijote
Amleto

1909

 At the Altar
 A Corner in Wheat
 The Country Doctor
 A Drunkard's Reformation
 Fools of Fate
 The Golden Louis
 The Hessian Renegades
 The Lonely Villa
 A Midsummer Night's Dream
 Les Misérables
 Resurrection
 The Sealed Room
 A Trap for Santa Claus
• Vadim

• O Nono Mandamento

• Camila O'Gorman

• The Scottish Covenanters

• Heroes of the Cross

• Sonho de Valsa

• The Life of Moses

• Gøngehøvdingen

• Revolutionsbryllup

• Locura de amor

• Et budskab til Napoleon paa Elba

• Andreas Hofer

References

Drama
1900s